Gheorghe Cantacuzino may refer to several members of the Cantacuzino family:

Georgios Kantakouzinos, Greek nationalist revolutionary
Gheorghe Grigore Cantacuzino (1833–1913), twice prime minister of Romania
Gheorghe Cantacuzino (Ban of Craiova), Ban of Oltenia
Grigore Gheorghe Cantacuzino (1872–1930), mayor of Bucharest
Gheorghe Cantacuzino-Grănicerul, soldier and fascist politician
Gheorghe I. Cantacuzino (born 1937), historian
Gogu Cantacuzino, economist and government minister
George Matei Cantacuzino (1899–1960), Romanian architect, painter and essayist